Tylan Michael Wallace (born May 13, 1999) is an American football wide receiver for the Baltimore Ravens of the National Football League (NFL). He played college football at Oklahoma State.

Early years
Wallace attended South Hills High School in Fort Worth, Texas. During his career he had 182 receptions for 3,760 yards and 48 touchdowns. He committed to Oklahoma State University, along with his twin brother Tracin, to play college football.

College career
As a freshman at Oklahoma State in 2017, Wallace played in 13 games and had seven receptions for 118 yards. He became a starter in 2018.

Professional career

Wallace was drafted by the Baltimore Ravens in the fourth round, 131st overall, of the 2021 NFL Draft. He signed his four-year rookie contract on May 14, 2021. Wallace was used mostly on special teams during the 2021 season, although he did have one start that year, recording a catch for 18 yards in a 21–41 Week 16 loss to the Cincinnati Bengals.

On December 3, 2022, Wallace was placed on injured reserve. He was activated on January 7, 2023.

References

External links
Oklahoma State Cowboys bio

1999 births
Living people
Players of American football from Fort Worth, Texas
American football wide receivers
Oklahoma State Cowboys football players
Twin sportspeople
Baltimore Ravens players